The MAAC men's soccer tournament is the conference championship tournament in soccer for the Metro Atlantic Athletic Conference (MAAC). The tournament has been held every year since 1988. It is a single-elimination tournament and seeding is based on regular season records. The winner, declared conference champion, receives the conference's automatic bid to the NCAA Division I men's soccer championship.

In 2012, the tournament changed from a ten-team to a four-team tournament. In 2016, the tournament moved to a six-team, three-round tournament with the top two seeds receiving first round byes.

Key

Finals

Championships by school

References

External links
 

 
Metro Atlantic Athletic Conference men's soccer
NCAA Division I men's soccer conference tournaments
1988 establishments in the United States
Recurring sporting events established in 1988